Khon is a drama dance genre from Thailand.

Khon may also refer to:
 KHON-TV, a Hawaiian television station
 Huron Regional Airport (ICAO code: KHON), an airport in the United States
 Khön clan of Sakya, a Tibetan clan and noble family

See also
 Khons (disambiguation), several topics related to Ancient Egypt